The following lists events that happened during 1855 in Chile.

Incumbents
President of Chile: Manuel Montt

Events

December
14 December - The Chilean Civil Code is passed into law by the Chilean Congress.
22 December - The newspaper El Ferrocarril is established.

Births
27 February - Roberto Silva Renard (died 1920)

Deaths
29 December - Buenaventura Cousiño Jorquera (born 1855)

References 

 
1850s in Chile
Chile
Chile